Fort Pickering Light, also known as Winter Island Light, is a lighthouse built in 1871 and discontinued by the Coast Guard in 1969. It was relit as a private aid to navigation by the City of Salem in 1983.

Winter Island Light is a constituent part of the Winter Island Historic District and Archeological District, which was added to the National Register of Historic Places on April 14, 1994.

See also
 National Register of Historic Places listings in Salem, Massachusetts
 List of lighthouses in the United States, Massachusetts
 Fort Pickering

References

Lighthouses completed in 1871
Lighthouses on the National Register of Historic Places in Massachusetts
Buildings and structures in Salem, Massachusetts
Lighthouses in Essex County, Massachusetts
Historic district contributing properties in Massachusetts
1871 establishments in Massachusetts
National Register of Historic Places in Salem, Massachusetts